Charles Perrot (1541–1608) was a French Reformed minister who served in the Republic of Geneva.

Perrot came from a French family who were Nobles of the Robe and was born in Paris. He studied at the Genevan Academy and in 1564 became a minister. He married Sarah Cop (daughter of Michel Cop) in 1566, and became a citizen of Geneva in 1567. Perrot served as a minister in the city from 1568 until his death. He acted as rector at the Academy from 1570-2 and 1588–92.

Scott Manetsch describes Perrot as "an idealist prone to discouragement, a man of deep piety who valued Christian charity as much a theological precision." Perrot's "pulpit jeremiads against social injustice and his advocacy for the poor sometimes put him at odds with Geneva's magistrates."

References

1541 births
1608 deaths
Clergy from Paris
17th-century clergy from the Republic of Geneva